The 2021 World Figure Skating Championships were held in Stockholm, Sweden from March 22–28, 2021. Figure skaters competed for the title of world champion in men's singles, ladies' singles, pairs, and ice dance. The competition was used to determine the entry quotas for each federation at the 2022 World Championships and was the first qualification event for the 2022 Winter Olympics.

Stockholm was announced as the host in June 2018. It was the first time that Stockholm had hosted the World Championships since 1947 and the first time that Sweden had hosted since 2008.

The World Championships were the only ISU Championship event held during the 2020–21 season, as the European, Four Continents, and World Junior Championships were all cancelled. Due to the COVID-19 pandemic, event organizers hosted the event in a bubble.

No public spectators were allowed at the event. Like the 2020–21 Grand Prix series, the World Championships were livestreamed on the ISU's YouTube channel with geographical restrictions for markets that have TV rights in place.

The 2015 Eurovision contest winner Måns Zelmerlöw and runner-up Polina Gagarina recorded the official song for the event, "Circles and Squares", which they performed live at the exhibition gala.

Impact of the COVID-19 pandemic

Scheduling
In early December, even as the 2021 European Championships and the 2020–21 Grand Prix Final were cancelled, ISU Vice President Alexander Lakernik stated that the ISU would make "every effort" to hold the World Championships. Initial concerns about Swedish COVID restrictions led Lakernik to comment that the ISU would have considered moving the competition to Russia, if not for the Court of Arbitration for Sport ban on the country holding World Championship events. A Swedish government ban which limited entrants in international competitions hosted by Sweden to only those from the European Union had been lifted on November 20, 2020. However, on December 22, 2020, Skate Sweden, the host federation, cancelled all domestic championships for the remainder of the 2020–21 season in compliance with Public Health Agency of Sweden guidelines.

During its January 28 meeting, the ISU Council affirmed that the World Championships would proceed as scheduled. The council also announced that the World Championships' status as an Olympic qualification event would be reevaluated and any potential changes determined based on the entries received by the ISU as of the March 1, 2021 deadline. On March 4, the ISU affirmed that the Olympic qualification process would proceed as previously announced, as nearly all ISU member nations with qualified skaters had confirmed entry to the 2021 World Championships.

In an effort to limit the number of skaters gathering in one place, the ISU announced that instead of a drawing process, the starting order for the free skate/free dance would be the reverse of the short program/rhythm dance placements.

ISU member nations' response 
As early as November 2020, Skate Canada stated that there was a possibility, if the event continued as planned, that they would not send skaters due to insufficient COVID-19 protocols. Despite the cancellation of its national championships and lack of competitive opportunities for its skaters, Skate Canada announced its selection criteria for naming a Worlds team in January 2021.

The Japan Skating Federation withdrew their delegation from the 2021 World Short Track Speed Skating Championships, scheduled for early March in Dordrecht, Netherlands, calling into question their figure skaters' participation at Worlds. The Japan Skating Federation eventually decided to send skaters to Worlds, due to it being an Olympic qualification event, unlike the World Short Track Speed Skating Championships. The Japanese delegation arrived at the competition throughout the weekend of March 20–22, with all athletes testing negative upon arrival.

All members of the Chinese Skating Association's team were vaccinated prior to flying to Stockholm.

Skaters' response 
Skaters came into the event with varying levels of preparation due to their respective governments' and federations' responses to the pandemic in their home country. Multiple skaters were also unable to train with their main coaches due to travel and/or visa restrictions and spent the season in temporary training situations, either on their own or with a different set of coaches.

In January 2021, four-time and defending ice dance world champions Gabriella Papadakis and Guillaume Cizeron of France announced that they would not compete at the World Championships, citing uncertainties regarding COVID; they planned to focus on the 2022 Winter Olympics next season instead. Several other skaters scheduled to compete at Worlds, including two-time defending men's world champion Nathan Chen of the United States, expressed during the weeks leading up to the competition that while they were grateful for the opportunity to compete, they had similar concerns about COVID safety protocols at Worlds; however, some skaters felt that proper precautions were being taken and that they would likely be safe at the event.

Criticism and concerns

COVID management 
During the months preceding skaters' and officials' arrival in Stockholm, a petition calling for the ISU to implement a tighter bubble and stricter quarantine rules garnered thousands of signatures. The ISU did not address the campaign's concerns about how COVID safety protocols would be enforced at the event.

The attendance of the Figure Skating Federation of Russia (FSR) drew particular scrutiny, as the federation was accused of holding several domestic and international events – including a Grand Prix event, the 2020 Rostelecom Cup – in violation of the ISU's COVID safety guidelines. In addition, a significant number of Russian skaters contracted COVID; at least 11 members of Russia's 17-person Worlds team tested positive at some point during the season. Nevertheless, all members of the FSR delegation tested negative during the initial round of testing administered upon arrival in Stockholm.

Judging 
Judges who could travel with fewer COVID restrictions were more available than those who could not, resulting in a geographically uneven distribution of judges on the panel.

After the event, there were some suggestions that, depending on the skaters’ nationality, judges were applying criteria inconsistently when awarding both TES and PCS marks. In addition, FSR's Alexandra Trusova's five-quad free skate performance, during which she fell multiple times and completed only one quad cleanly, was cited as an example of judges inflating TES and PCS marks in favor of "technical bravery over artistic brilliance". Trusova rose from 12th after the short program to the bronze medal position.

COVID at Worlds 
Crown Princess Victoria had been scheduled to open the competition and participate in the opening ceremony, before she and her husband, Prince Daniel, contracted COVID-19 in the weeks prior to the event. She instead appeared in a video message from Haga Palace to welcome the athletes.

Delegations began arriving on March 20 and 21, and members underwent the required multiple PCR tests and quarantine period in their hotel rooms until a negative result was returned. Attendees were not eligible for accreditation until passing a second PCR test. After receiving accreditation, limited testing was conducted and attendees were only required to fill out daily symptom questionnaires and undergo temperature checks.

On March 22, the ISU announced that one positive case had been found during one of the initial rounds of testing and that contact tracing procedures were being undertaken. The person with the positive case, later revealed to be Viktoriia Safonova of Belarus, was quarantined and not allowed to participate. Safonova's coach subsequently tested negative in a second round of testing, and Safonova, who traveled from a different city, had had no contact with the other members of the Belarusian team or their coaches. The ISU did not enforce an isolation period for close contacts.

On March 24, the ISU announced that a second positive case had been found, also during the initial round of testing upon arrival and prior to accreditation. Without accreditation, neither positive had been let into the competition bubble.

On March 26, the ISU announced that a third positive case had been found, with this case being discovered within the bubble. After the event, ice dancer Simon Proulx-Sénécal of Armenia revealed that he had tested positive on March 25, the day before the ice dance competition was scheduled to start, and asked for a re-test prior to the rhythm dance on March 26. As the test result did not come back until after the rhythm dance had concluded, Proulx-Sénécal and his partner, Tina Garabedian, were not allowed to compete. The result came back as a second positive. Proulx-Sénécal expressed that he believed his first test was a false positive, as his federation later received a written test result stating that his second test taken the morning of the rhythm dance was negative, not positive as initially conveyed to their team doctor. He subsequently tested negative twice more, once the day after the rhythm dance in Stockholm (March 27) and once upon returning to his training base in Montreal on March 29. As of June 2021, the ISU had launched an investigation into the handling of the situation.

Qualification

Age and minimum TES requirements 
Skaters were eligible for the 2021 World Championships if they turned 15 years of age before July 1, 2020, and if they met the minimum technical elements score requirements. For the 2021 World Championships, the ISU accepted scores if they were obtained at senior or junior-level ISU-recognized international competitions during the current or preceding two seasons and recorded at least 21 days before the first official practice day of the championships.

Traditionally, scores must be attained from an ISU-recognized senior-level international competition during the current or preceding season. However, due to the ongoing pandemic, the ISU extended the validity to scores attained at an ISU-recognized international competition at either the senior or junior level during the current or preceding two seasons. Skaters who did not have any technical minimums (e.g. new pairs or ice dance teams) or still did not meet technical minimums under the expanded timeline could submit video via their federations to the ISU for virtual judging.

Number of entries per discipline 
Normally, the number of entries would be based on the results of the preceding Worlds. Because the 2020 World Championships were cancelled, results from the 2019 World Championships were used instead.

Schedule

Entries 
Member nations began announcing their entries in December 2020. The International Skating Union published a complete list of entries on March 2, 2021.

Changes to preliminary entries

Medal summary

Medalists
Medals awarded to the skaters who achieve the highest overall placements in each discipline:

Small medals awarded to the skaters who achieve the highest short program or rhythm dance placements in each discipline:

Medals awarded to the skaters who achieve the highest free skating or free dance placements in each discipline:

Medals by country 
Table of medals for overall placement:

Table of small medals for placement in the short/rhythm segment:

Table of small medals for placement in the free segment:

Results

Men 
Nathan Chen of the United States became the second American and the fifth skater since 1980 to win three consecutive World titles, following Scott Hamilton, Kurt Browning, Alexei Yagudin, and Patrick Chan.

Ladies 
The Russian team, competing as FSR due to CAS sanctions against the country, became the second team to ever sweep the ladies' podium at a World Championships after the United States did so in 1991.

Pairs 
Anastasia Mishina / Aleksandr Galliamov of FSR became the first pairs team to win gold in their Worlds debut since Ekaterina Gordeeva / Sergei Grinkov of the Soviet Union did so in 1986.

Ice dance

Olympic qualification event 

The results of the 2021 World Championships determined 82 spots for the 2022 Winter Olympics: 23 entries in men's singles, 24 in ladies' singles, 16 in pairs, and 19 in ice dance. The available spots were awarded going down the results list, with multiple spots being awarded first. One allocated spot in men's singles was unused due to an insufficient number of member nations meeting the criteria, and the spot was re-allocated to the qualification event, 2021 CS Nebelhorn Trophy.

At the World Championships, countries were able to qualify up to three entries in each discipline according to the system in place for earning multiple spots to the 2022 World Championships. However, for the Olympics, if a country earned two or three spots, but did not have two or three skaters/teams, respectively, qualified for the free segment, the country must qualify the second or third spot at Nebelhorn Trophy. Each discipline qualified independently.

The following ISU member nations earned Olympic quota spots for their National Olympic Committee at the World Championships:

Notes

References

External links 
 
 Official program
 2021 World Figure Skating Championships at the International Skating Union
 Results

World Figure Skating Championships
2021 World Figure Skating Championships
World Figure Skating Championships
2021 in Swedish sport
March 2021 sports events in Europe
Sport in Stockholm